Charlotte Devlin (born 23 February 1998) is an English footballer who plays as a midfielder or a forward for Birmingham City in the FA Women's Championship on loan from Leicester City.

Club career

Arsenal 
 
Devlin signed her first professional contract with Arsenal in June 2016. She had been at the club since she was 14 having joined from the Millwall Centre of Excellence, and helped Arsenal's development squad to a league and cup double in 2015/16.

Millwall Lionesses 
Devlin initially returned to Millwall Lionesses on loan for the 2017 Spring Series, scoring the winner in a 2–1 victory against London Bees in her first game with the club. The move was made permanent prior to the start of the 2017–18 season. In the one full season she had at Millwall, Devlin led the team in goals with 9, making her the fifth highest scorer in the WSL 2.

Manchester United 
 
In July 2018, Devlin joined Manchester United for their inaugural season in the FA Women's Championship. She made her competitive debut for Manchester United, as an 89th minute substitute for Lauren James, in a 1–0 League Cup victory against Liverpool on 19 August, and her Championship debut in a 12–0 win against Aston Villa on 9 September. She scored her first goal for United on 4 November in a 4–1 win over Tottenham. She was released by the club at the end of the season having made 21 appearances.

Charlton Athletic 
On 9 August 2019, Devlin signed with FA Women's Championship team Charlton Athletic for the 2019–20 season. Devlin made her debut in their opening game on 25 August 2019, playing the full 90 minutes in a 0–0 home draw with Lewes. On 15 September, Devlin was sent off after receiving two yellow cards in Charlton's 2–0 league loss to London City Lionesses.

Leicester City
Devlin signed an 18-month contract with fellow Championship side Leicester City on 8 January 2020. Devlin made her debut in a 1–0 league loss against Durham on 12 January 2020. The team won the 2020–21 FA Women's Championship title, earning promotion to the FA WSL for the first time in their history. On 4 June 2021, Devlin signed a new two-year contract.

Birmingham City 
On 29 July 2022, Devlin moved on a season-long loan to Birmingham City in the FA Women's Championship.

International career 
Devlin represented England at the 2015 UEFA Women's Under-17 Championship in Iceland, scoring in a 3–1 win over the host nation.

She has also played for the country at under-19 level and was part of the team that lifted the Women's International Cup in 2016 having won all three tournament games against France, Northern Ireland and USA.

In January 2019, Devlin was a late addition to Mo Marley's Under-21 training camp at St. George's Park.

Career statistics

Club 
.

Honours

Club
Manchester United
 FA Women's Championship: 2018–19

Leicester City
 FA Women's Championship: 2020–21

References

External links 

 Profile at the Charlton Athletic F.C. website
 
 

Living people
English women's footballers
Women's association football forwards
1998 births
Leicester City W.F.C. players
Manchester United W.F.C. players
Millwall Lionesses L.F.C. players
Charlton Athletic W.F.C. players
Arsenal W.F.C. players
England women's youth international footballers